Folweni is a small middle income town located south of Durban in the province of KwaZulu-Natal, South Africa.

Sections 
Folweni is divided into three sections namely;
A-section
B-section
C-section

History 
The original population of Folweni were people who stayed in Umlazi who were forced to migrate when the apartheid government implemented the Group Areas Act.

On 26 July 1992 During the political conflict between the ANC and the IFP, a group of men believed to be IFP loyalists armed with AK47s descended on Folweni and killed approximately 20 people who were attending a ceremony, the event is now known as the Folweni Massacre.

Health Care 

Folweni Clinic is currently the main source of health care. It is located in the B-section of the town.

Education

High schools
Folweni High School
Ntwenhle High School
Siphephele High School

Primary schools
Masuku Primary School
Hlengisizwe Primary School
Mklomelo Junior Primary School
Golokodo Primary School
Celubuhle Senior Primary Secondary School
Dabulizizwe Primary School
Phembisizwe Primary School

Notable people 
 Njabulo Ngcobo, footballer

References 

Populated places in eThekwini Metropolitan Municipality